Cervellati Glacier is the  long glacier situated southeast of Patton Glacier and northwest of Ramorino Glacier on the east slope of Sentinel Range in the Ellsworth Mountains, Antarctica.  It flows northeastwards between Tyree Ridge and Epperly Ridge, and enters Crosswell Glacier southeast of Mount Bearskin. The feature was named by US-ACAN in 2006 after Roberto Cervellati, Italian representative to the SCAR Expert Group on Geographic Information, 1992–2006, and director of the SCAR Composite Gazetteer of Antarctica in the same period.

See also
 List of glaciers in the Antarctic
 Glaciology

Maps
 Vinson Massif.  Scale 1:250 000 topographic map.  Reston, Virginia: US Geological Survey, 1988.
 Antarctic Digital Database (ADD). Scale 1:250000 topographic map of Antarctica. Scientific Committee on Antarctic Research (SCAR). Since 1993, regularly updated.

References

External links
 Cervellati Glacier SCAR Antarctic Gazetteer.

Glaciers of Ellsworth Land